Barjo is a 1992 French film adaptation of Philip K. Dick's non-science fiction novel Confessions of a Crap Artist, originally written in 1959 and published in 1975, the only non-science fiction novel of Dick's to be published in his lifetime. The film was directed by Jérôme Boivin and written by Jacques Audiard and Jérôme Boivin, and stars  Anne Brochet, Richard Bohringer and Hippolyte Girardot. "Barjo" translates as "nutcase" or "nut job".

Plot
Barjo (Hippolyte Girardot) is eccentric, naive and obsessive.  After he accidentally burns down his house during a "scientific" experiment, he moves in with his impulsive twin sister Fanfan (Anne Brochet), who is married to Charles "the Aluminum King" (Richard Bohringer).  In his new surroundings, Barjo continues his old habits: cataloging old science magazines, testing bizarre inventions and filling his notebooks with his observations about human behavior and his thoughts about the end of the world.  Through Barjo's journals we see the development of conflict and sexual tension between Fanfan and Charles, and the descent of Charles into madness.

Cast

 Richard Bohringer as Charles
 Anne Brochet as Fanfan
 Hippolyte Girardot as Barjo
 Consuelo De Haviland as Madame Hermelin
 Renaud Danner as Michel
 Nathalie Boutefeu  as Gwen
 Jac Berrocal as Mage Gerardini
 Camille Gentet as Fanfan enfant
 Charles-Elie Rouart as Barjo enfant

References

External links

 

1992 films
French comedy-drama films
Films based on American novels
Films based on works by Philip K. Dick
Films with screenplays by Jacques Audiard
1990s French films